On Marvellous Things Heard (Latin: De mirabilibus auscultationibus) is a collection of thematically arranged anecdotes traditionally attributed to Aristotle but written by a Pseudo-Aristotle. The material included in the collection mainly deals with the natural world (e.g., plants, animals, minerals, weather, geography). The work is an example of the paradoxography literary genre.

According to the revised Oxford translation of The Complete Works of Aristotle this treatise's "spuriousness has never been seriously contested".

See also 
Corpus Aristotelicum
Antigonus of Carystus

Notes

References

 Thomas, Rosalind (2002). Herodotus in context: ethnography, science and the art of persuasion. Cambridge University Press, 
 Jonathan Barnes (ed.) (61995)The Complete Works of Aristotle, Volume 2, Princeton University Press,

External links
 Greek text
English translation
 
__notoc__

Pseudoaristotelian works